Batman: Under the Red Hood is a 2010 American animated action thriller direct-to-video film produced by Warner Bros. Animation and released by Warner Home Video. It is the eighth film of the DC Universe Animated Original Movies. The writer, Judd Winick, also wrote the "Under the Hood" run in the monthly Batman comic the film is based on. The film was released on July 27, 2010, and received highly positive reviews from critics, who praised its plot, animation, and focus on storytelling. It is generally considered to be one of the best in the DC Universe Animated Original Movies line. The film was also a commercial success, grossing over $12 million in home video sales.

The two-disc special edition and Blu-ray also includes an animated short featuring Jonah Hex. An interactive short spiritual sequel/film adaptation, Batman: Death in the Family, was released on October 13, 2020,  ten years after Red Hood.

Plot
Ra's al Ghul realizes his mistake in hiring the Joker to use him as a distraction while he destroyed Europe's financial districts after learning that he has captured Jason Todd, the second Robin, Batman's partner. In Sarajevo, Bosnia, the Joker brutally assaults Jason, in an abandoned warehouse with a crowbar. Jason is locked in the warehouse with a bomb, which explodes and kills him before Batman arrives.

Five years later in Gotham City, a mysterious vigilante called Red Hood assembles a meeting of the city's most prominent drug dealers. He announces a takeover of their drug trade, taking only 40 percent of the profit while offering them protection from both Black Mask and Batman - under punishment of death to anyone caught dealing drugs to children.

Batman stops an attempted theft of a shipment belonging to Black Mask, which is the advanced android Amazo. Batman destroys Amazo with the help of Jason's predecessor Dick Grayson a.k.a. Nightwing and discovers the thieves are working for Red Hood who then kills them. He chases Red Hood to Ace Chemicals, where an explosion destroys the facility. Batman and Nightwing interrogate the Joker at Arkham Asylum about Red Hood, but he denies involvement.

Black Mask puts a hit on Red Hood for Amazo's destruction. Batman and Nightwing prevent Red Hood from hijacking Black Mask's next weapon shipment. They chase Red Hood to a train station, where he escapes after detonating a bomb, which injures Nightwing. Batman and Nightwing realize Red Hood is trained and has knowledge of Batman's tactics and gear. A review of audio footage of the chase reveals Red Hood knows Batman's secret identity.

Batman recalls Jason performing the same maneuvers as Robin and that Jason grew more violent and bloodthirsty as he aged, with Batman having to stop him many times from nearly killing criminals. The Fearsome Hand of Four lure out Red Hood and nearly overpower him until Batman helps incapacitate three of them and Red Hood kills the fourth, horrifying Batman. Red Hood explains he is doing what Batman will not: killing criminals who are not afraid.

Batman analyzes a blood sample of Red Hood drawn from the battle and it matches Jason's. After discovering Jason's corpse is fake, Batman confronts Ra's al Ghul and demands to know the truth. Ra's explains that he felt responsible for Jason's death and, as a peace offering, he swapped Jason's body for a fake and revived him in the Lazarus Pit. Following his resurrection, Jason was driven insane and escaped.

After surviving an assassination attempt by Red Hood, Black Mask sets the Joker free, tasking him with killing Red Hood. However, Joker instead abducts Black Mask and the drug dealers and plans to set them on fire; Red Hood appears and reveals his real target all along has been the Joker. Batman saves the hostages and Red Hood takes the Joker. Red Hood brutally beats the Joker in revenge for his own murder and confronts Batman.

During the fight, Red Hood removes his helmet, confirming he is Jason. Their fight makes its way to the dilapidated building where Jason is keeping the Joker and ends with Jason holding Batman at gunpoint. Though he has forgiven Batman for not saving him, Jason is upset and angry that Joker is still alive after killing him. Batman admits he has thought constantly about torturing and killing the Joker but will not, fearing he will not stop if he kills even once.

Jason tosses Batman a gun and gives him an ultimatum—he will execute the Joker unless Batman shoots him. Batman refuses and drops the gun, causing Jason to shoot at him. Batman throws a batarang, which jams Jason's pistol. When Jason pulls the trigger again, the gun is destroyed and his right hand gets mangled. Defeated, Jason sets off a time bomb and Batman subdues the Joker before attempting to save Jason.

The bomb explodes; Batman and the Joker survive but Jason is gone. The Joker is returned to Arkham and Black Mask is arrested for his involvement in the Joker's escape. At the Batcave, Alfred offers to remove the glass case display of Jason's Robin costume after everything that has happened, but Bruce refuses, claiming it doesn't change anything.

A final flashback shows Jason's first day as Robin, which he cheerfully declares is the best day of his life.

Cast

Crew
 Andrea Romano – Voice Director

Music

The score for Batman: Under the Red Hood was composed by Christopher Drake, who had previously scored several animated films set in the DC Universe. It was inspired by the soundtracks of Batman: Mask of the Phantasm which features a traditional orchestral score and The Dark Knight which features a computer generated, electronic score. Drake said that since Under the Red Hood has a darker tone than previous DC Universe animated films, he chose not to use the music as epic and melodramatic instead opting for a more intimate, minimal and restrained tone. He added that this is the first DC film he has scored that didn't rely on using a large choir to make the fight scenes sound bigger. Drake scored the film as a reference to modern minimalist electronic scores because the film's director Brandon Vietti felt that Under the Red Hood needed to go in a different, more modern direction to separate it from previous DC animation scores. At that point, Drake introduced more electronic and ambient elements, like synthesized and processed electronic guitar, while retaining orchestral elements.

Batman: Under The Red Hood – Soundtrack to The Animated Original Movie was released by WaterTower Music on July 27, 2010 and features 18 tracks composed for the film.

Commercial performance

The film grossed over $12 million in domestic home video sales, making it one of the highest grossing DC animated films.

Critical reception

Batman: Under the Red Hood received positive reviews from critics who praised the film's direction, animation, emotional weight of the story, and voice acting particularly for Jensen Ackles.
Demeter's review for The World's Finest stated: "I have to say this really was a damn good film". James Harvey's review on the same website was even more positive, calling it "a mature and faithful take on the Batman lore". IGN gave the movie an 8 out of 10, calling it "An interesting peek inside the psyche of Batman and the fine line between good and evil". It was the highest rated direct-to-video Batman film until the release of The Dark Knight Returns.

Continuation
A follow-up film titled Batman: Death in the Family was released on October 13, 2020, a decade after Under the Red Hood with Greenwood, Martella, and DiMaggio reprising their roles. Zehra Fazal plays Talia al Ghul and Gary Cole plays both Two-Face and Commissioner Gordon. It is an interactive narrative where the viewer chooses what happens in the story.

References

External links

 
 
 Batman: Under the Red Hood at The World's Finest

2010 animated films
2010 direct-to-video films
American direct-to-video films
2010 action films
2010s American animated films
2010s direct-to-video animated superhero films
2010s science fiction films
2010s animated superhero films
American adult animated films
American action films
Animated action films
Animated Batman films
Animated science fiction films
Animated superhero films
DC Universe Animated Original Movies
2010s English-language films
Films about atonement
Films directed by Brandon Vietti
Films set in psychiatric hospitals
Films set in Sarajevo
Resurrection in film
American vigilante films
Red Hood
Robin (character) films
Animated films about revenge
Warner Bros. direct-to-video films
Warner Bros. direct-to-video animated films
2010s superhero films
American superhero films